Akkaphan Namart (born January 28, 1985) is a Thai actor. Namart graduated from Bangkok University.

He has starred in Thai dramas such as Mon Ruk Kao Tom Mud (2009), Sapai Glai Peun Tiang (2009), Sao Chai Hi-Tech (2010)

Film

Films 
  Nak Prok (2010) guest appearance

References

1985 births
Living people
Akkaphan Namart
Akkaphan Namart
Akkaphan Namart